SMEP may refer to:

 Plant matrix metalloproteinase, also referred as SMEP1
 Standard model of elementary particles
 Supervisor mode execution protection, a security feature of some Intel CPUs

Organisations
 SMEP Microfinance Bank
 Paris Evangelical Missionary Society
 Sony Music Entertainment Philippines, a defunct company
 Sony Music Entertainment Poland
 Society of Metallurgical Engineers of the Philippines, an engineering society
 Society of Mechanical Engineers of Pakistan; See Ghulam Ishaq Khan Institute of Engineering Sciences and Technology
 Society of Multivariate Experimental Psychology